The Albuquerque mayoral election of 2013 occurred on October 8, 2013. The candidate that garnered more than 50% of the vote was elected Mayor. Otherwise, the two candidates with the most votes would advance to a runoff, scheduled for November 19, 2013. The election is officially nonpartisan but candidates receive support and endorsements from their respective parties or affiliated organizations.

Incumbent Republican Mayor Richard J. Berry ran for re-election to a second term in office, and won the election with 68% of the vote.

Candidates

Declared
 Richard J. Berry, incumbent Mayor (Voter registration: Republican)
 Pete Dinelli, former City Councilman, former Albuquerque Public Safety Director (Voter registration: Democratic)
 Paul Heh, retired policeman (Voter registration: Republican)

Withdrawn
 Margaret Aragon de Chavez, former First Lady of Albuquerque (endorsed Pete Dinelli) (Voter registration: Democratic)

Declined
 Diane Denish, former Lieutenant Governor of New Mexico, nominee for Governor of New Mexico in 2010 (Voter registration: Democratic)
 Ken Sanchez, City Councilman (Voter registration: Democratic)

General election

Polling

Results

References

Albuquerque
2013 New Mexico elections
2013